Mount Sherman is a high mountain summit in the Mosquito Range of the Rocky Mountains of North America. The mountain was named in honor of General William Tecumseh Sherman.

Mountain
Mount Sherman is one of the most nondescript of the fourteeners, and one of the easiest to climb; 
it is recommended as a beginner fourteener. It is also the only fourteener that has had a successful aircraft landing on its summit.

Sherman Mine
The Sherman mine, located in upper Iowa Gulch at and above 12,200 ft. on the west flank of Mt. Sherman, produced over 10 million ounces of silver, mostly between 1968 and 1982, with a value of over $300 million at 2010 prices. The Sherman silver-lead-zinc deposit is hosted in dolomites of the Early Mississippian Leadville Formation. Mineralization is within an integrated cavern system that developed in these carbonate rocks in Late Mississippian time. Pb-Zn-Ag mineralization was emplaced into the old cave system at about 272 ± 18  Ma, during the Early Permian period.

Secondary ore minerals from the Sherman mine are popular with mineral collectors. The prominent ruins of the historic buildings and structures of the Hilltop Mine (above the more recent Sherman mine workings) are often visited and photographed by hikers and mountaineers.

See also

List of mountain peaks of Colorado
List of Colorado fourteeners

References

External links

 
Mount Sherman on Summitpost
Geologic Map of the Mount Sherman 7.5ʹ Quadrangles, Park and Lake Counties, Colorado United States Geological Survey

Sherman
Sherman
Sherman
Sherman
Sherman